"Where We're Going" is a song by Scottish singer-songwriter and acoustic guitarist Gerry Cinnamon. It was released as a single on 21 February 2020 by Little Runaway Records as the fifth single from his second studio album The Bonny. The song peaked at number 39 on the UK Singles Chart.

Background
Talking about the song, Gerry Cinnamon said, "I wrote years ago at a dark time in my life. Folk can attach their own meaning to it but really it’s about being in a shit place with no way out, mixed with a gentle reminder to hold on to whatever wee dream you have. A mixture of dark stuff with some positive reality. If you’re in a real shit situation it can be near impossible to see a positive outcome unless you’re either an idiot or a serial optimist. I don’t want to contribute to the negative shit in my writing, there’s more than enough of that going around already. If I write songs about the bad stuff I think it’s only polite to remind the listener of the real reality. That it doesn’t matter where you’re at, it’s where you’re going that matters. Put the graft in and better times are inevitable. Easy."

Charts

Certifications

Release history

References

2020 songs
2020 singles
Gerry Cinnamon songs